Superego is a psychoanalytic theory developed by Sigmund Freud.

Superego, Superegos, Super ego or Super-ego may also refer to:

Arts and entertainment 
Superego (band), Australian hip hop group
Superego (Disclosure song), 2015
Superego (podcast), American improv comedy show
List of Superego episodes
Superegos, 2014 German drama film
Superego (album), released 1997 by Finnish pop group Egotrippi
Super-Ego (comics), fictional character from the 1990s Marvel Comics
SuperEgo, record label established by musician Aimee Mann

See also 
Superego resistance